Zoom the White Dolphin, known in Japan as , is a 1971 anime series created by Vladimir Tarta. Directed by René Borg, the show was produced by Telcia, Saga Films and Japan's Eiken.

The series debuted in France in 1971 on ORTF's second network and later aired from 29 June 1981 on FR3. The Japanese version of the series ran on TBS in 1975. An English dub was produced and broadcast internationally on networks such as ABC Television (Australia), CBC Television (Canada) and ITV (United Kingdom), with a compilation film airing on Nickelodeon (USA) as part of Special Delivery.

Synopsis
The series presents the adventures of Zoom, a white dolphin, and his friends, two children who live with their sailor uncle. The cast includes several animals including a mynah bird (who understands the dolphin language in addition to the language of the other animals and the humans on the island and acts as a translator), a koala, and a sloth.

During their adventures, Zoom meets a beautiful female dolphin, called Za-za-zoom in the English version, with whom he has a baby.

A condensed feature-length version, dubbed in English, was released on videocassette in the United States by Embassy Home Entertainment in 1985. The release was never re-issued on any other home video format.

Product promotion
Zoom was the mascot for Nestlé's Galak chocolate brand until the company ended its licence in 2003. However, the series rights-holders sued Nestlé after extant stocks of Galak product featuring the character continued to circulate.

Remake

In 2013, TF1, Media Valley and Marzipan Film announced plans to produce a 52 thirteen-minute episode CG-animated reboot in collaboration with ZDF and TiJi. The series debuted in France on 30 August 2015. A second 52-episode season debut on 4 October 2020.

References

External links
 
 Iruka to Shônen : information on Japanese version of the series
 Series description at Planète Jeunesse  
 Coucoucircus: series theme 
 

1970s French animated television series
1971 French television series debuts
1971 anime television series debuts
French children's animated adventure television series
Japanese children's animated adventure television series
CBC Television original programming
Fictional dolphins
Fictional sloths and anteaters
Polynesia in fiction
Animated television series about mammals
Animated television series about birds
Television series about koalas
Animated television series about children